McConnell Arena is an ice hockey arena located on the corner of Pine Avenue and Park Avenue right beside Mount Royal in Montreal, Quebec, Canada. The arena is owned and operated by McGill University, and is the home to the McGill Redbirds men's and McGill Martlets women's ice hockey teams.  The ice surface is the standard North American size, 61 metres (200 feet) long by 26 metres (85 feet) wide.

Since an expansion in 2004, the arena has a capacity of 1,600 people.

History
McConnell Arena was originally built in 1956 due to a donation by John Wilson McConnell, a Canadian businessman, newspaper publisher, humanitarian, philanthropist and senior governor of McGill University. It was renovated in 2000 at a cost of $4 million.

References

External links

McConnell Arena

Sports venues completed in 1956
Indoor ice hockey venues in Canada
Sports venues in Montreal
Sport at McGill University
McGill University buildings
University sports venues in Canada
1956 establishments in Quebec
University and college buildings completed in 1956